Oak Leaf is a city in Ellis County, Texas, United States. The population was 1,298 at the 2010 census.

Geography

Oak Leaf is located in northern Ellis County at  (32.520253, –96.855654). It is bordered to the northwest by Ovilla, to the north by Glenn Heights, and to the east by Red Oak.

Oak Leaf is nearly all residential. Besides homes, there is 1 church, 1 city office, 1 auto repair shop.

Demographics

As of the census of 2000, there were 1,209 people, 401 households, and 364 families residing in the city. The population density was 524.9 people per square mile (203.0/km). There were 408 housing units at an average density of 177.1 per square mile (68.5/km). The racial makeup of the town was 93.05% White, 3.23% African American, 0.17% Native American, 0.17% Asian, 1.82% from other races, and 1.57% from two or more races. Hispanic or Latino of any race were 5.38% of the population.

There were 401 households, out of which 39.7% had children under the age of 18 living with them, 81.5% were married couples living together, 7.0% had a female householder with no husband present, and 9.0% were non-families. 7.2% of all households were made up of individuals, and 2.2% had someone living alone who was 65 years of age or older. The average household size was 3.01 and the average family size was 3.15.

In the city, the population was spread out, with 27.3% under the age of 18, 6.5% from 18 to 24, 26.1% from 25 to 44, 32.5% from 45 to 64, and 7.5% who were 65 years of age or older. The median age was 41 years. For every 100 females, there were 106.0 males. For every 100 females age 18 and over, there were 102.1 males.

The median income for a household in the city was $80,274, and the median income for a family was $81,824. Males had a median income of $51,522 versus $32,500 for females. The per capita income for the city was $28,327. About 1.7% of families and 2.3% of the population were below the poverty line, including 1.1% of those under age 18 and none of those age 65 or over.

Education

Public schools 
The city of Oak Leaf is served by the Red Oak Independent School District.

References

External links

 City of Oak Leaf – Official site

Dallas–Fort Worth metroplex
Cities in Ellis County, Texas
Cities in Texas